Herochroma crassipunctata is a moth of the family Geometridae first described by Sergei Alphéraky in 1888. It is found in Turkestan and India.

Subspecies
Herochroma crassipunctata crassipunctata (Turkestan)
Herochroma crassipunctata farinosa (Warren, 1893) (northern India)

References

Moths described in 1888
Pseudoterpnini
Moths of Asia